The Liga Națională  is a league of professional women's handball league teams in Romania. Run by the Romanian Handball Federation, the competition is also known as the Liga Florilor MOL and is contested by sixteen teams.

The National Handball League is Romania's top-level domestic women's handball-league club competition. The team with the most Liga Națională championships is SCM Râmnicu Vâlcea with twenty.

The FRH organization also oversees the Divizia A.

The European Handball Federation (EHF) ranks the Liga Națională 3rd in the coefficients of leagues based on performances in European competitions over the past seasons.

Current teams

Teams for season 2020–21

CS Minaur Baia Mare
Gloria Bistrița 
Dunărea Brăila
CSM București
Rapid București 
Gloria Buzău 
Măgura Cisnădie
CSU Cluj
SCM Craiova 
SCM Râmnicu Vâlcea
CSM Slatina
Prahova Ploiești
HC Zalău
Dacia Mioveni
CSM Galati

Awards 
The Simona Arghir-Sandu Trophy is awarded annually to the leading goal scorer in the Liga Națională (LNHF). It is named in honour of right back Simona Arghir-Sandu.

List of champions

1946–1963 (11 players)

1958–present (7 players)

Results by teams

7 players

11 players

EHF league coefficients

EHF league ranking
EHF League Ranking for 2022/23 season:

1.  (1)  Nemzeti Bajnokság I (157.67)
2.  (5)  Ligue Butagaz Énergie (118.50) 
3.  (2)  Russian Superleague (114.50) 
4.  (3)  Bambusa Kvindeligaen (109.00)
5.  (6)  REMA 1000-ligaen (102.77) 
6.  (4)  Liga Națională (94.50)

Notable foreign players 

Angola
  Azenaide Carlos
  Albertina Kassoma
  Liliana Venâncio
  Magda Cazanga
  Ruth João
Belarus
  Natallia Vasileuskaya
  Dziyana Ilyina
  Maria Kanaval
Brazil 
  Eduarda Amorim
  Alexandra do Nascimento
  Bárbara Arenhart 
  Ana Paula Rodrigues-Belo
  Mayssa Pessoa
  Deonise Cavaleiro-Fachinello
  Fernanda da Silva 
  Samara da Silva
  Larissa Araújo
  Mariana Costa 
  Jéssica Quintino
  Francielle da Rocha
  Elaine Gomes
  Karoline de Souza
  Giulia Guarieiro
  Renata Arruda
Bulgaria
  Ekaterina Dzhukeva
Czech Republic
  Helena Ryšánková
Croatia
  Jelena Grubišić
  Sanela Knezović
  Lidija Horvat
  Katarina Ježić 
  Valentina Blažević
  Ivana Kapitanović  
  Kristina Prkačin
Denmark
  Maria Stokholm
  Line Jørgensen
  Simone Böhme 
  Ann Grete Nørgaard
France
  Amandine Leynaud
  Allison Pineau
  Camille Ayglon-Saurina
  Siraba Dembélé-Pavlović
  Grâce Zaadi 
  Laura Glauser
  Kalidiatou Niakaté
  Alexandra Lacrabère
  Orlane Kanor
  Gnonsiane Niombla
  Laurisa Landre
  Julie Foggea
Germany
  Ewgenija Minevskaja
  Meike Schmelzer
Hungary
  Gabriella Juhász 
  Gabriella Szűcs 
  Dorina Korsós
  Rita Borbás 
  Asma Elghaoui
Japan
  Asuka Fujita
Montenegro
  Katarina Bulatović
  Jovanka Radičević 
  Majda Mehmedović
  Marija Jovanović
  Itana Grbić
  Andrea Klikovac 
  Dijana Ujkić
  Bobana Klikovac
  Ljubica Nenezić
  Marta Batinović-Žderić 
  Ema Ramusović
  Dijana Mugoša
Netherlands
  Estavana Polman
  Tess Wester
  Martine Smeets
  Yvette Broch
  Lois Abbingh
North Macedonia
  Marija Shteriova
  Elena Livrinikj
  Jovana Sazdovska
  Elena Gjeorgjievska
Norway
  Nora Mørk
  Camilla Herrem
  Marit Malm Frafjord
  Emilie Hegh Arntzen
  Malin Aune
  Marie Davidsen
  Amanda Kurtović
  Maren Nyland Aardahl
  Hege Løken
Poland
  Aleksandra Zych
  Sylwia Lisewska
Serbia
  Andrea Lekić
  Dragana Cvijić 
  Kristina Liščević   
  Željka Nikolić
  Jelena Trifunović
  Jelena Lavko
  Marina Dmitrović
  Jovana Kovačević
  Dijana Radojević
  Katarina Krpež Šlezak
  Aleksandra Vukajlović
Slovenia
  Elizabeth Omoregie
  Barbara Lazović
  Amra Pandzić
South Korea
  Woo Sun-hee 
Spain
  Carmen Martín 
  Alexandrina Cabral
  Silvia Navarro
  Marta López
  Alicia Fernández
  Mireya González
  Darly Zogbi de Paula 
  Almudena Rodríguez
  Ainhoa Hernández
  Jennifer Gutiérrez Bermejo
  Irene Espínola
Sweden
  Isabelle Gulldén
  Linnea Torstenson
  Nathalie Hagman
  Sabina Jacobsen
  Linn Blohm
  Filippa Idéhn 
  Mikaela Massing
  Evelina Eriksson
  Daniela de Jong
  Elin Hansson
Russia
  Emiliya Turey 
  Yulia Managarova 
  Kseniya Makeyeva
  Ekaterina Gaiduk
  Ekaterina Vetkova  
  Regina Kalinichenko 
  Ekaterina Matlashova
  Yulia Khavronina  
  Olga Gorshenina
  Elena Utkina
  Marina Sudakova
Ukraine
  Anastasiia Pidpalova 
  Iryna Glibko
  Iaroslava Burlachenko
  Nataliya Savchyn
Tunisia
  Mouna Jlezi
Turkey  
  Yeliz Özel

Notable foreign coaches  
  Anja Andersen
  Mette Klit 
  Kim Rasmussen 
  Helle Thomsen 
  Jakob Vestergaard  
  Magnus Johansson
  Per Johansson
  Tomas Ryde 
  Herbert Müller
  Péter Kovács
  Carlos Viver
  Bent Dahl

See also
 
 Romania women's national handball team
 Divizia A (men's handball)

References

External links 
Romanian Handball Federation

 
Women's handball in Romania
Women's handball leagues
Handball competitions in Romania
Women's sports leagues in Romania
Romania
Professional sports leagues in Romania